Otterburn may refer to:

Otterburn, Northumberland, England
 Otterburn Training Area, the UK's largest military firing range
Otterburn, North Yorkshire, England
Otterburn, Michigan, an unincorporated location now a part of Swartz Creek, Michigan
Otterburn, Virginia
Otterburn (Bedford, Virginia), a house
Otterburn Park, Quebec

People with the surname
Adam Otterburn, 16th century Scottish lawyer and diplomat

See also
Battle of Otterburn